James Stevenson (born 12 October 1958) is an English punk/alternative rock guitarist, at one time a member of the Alarm, Gene Loves Jezebel, Gen X, the Cult, Holy Holy, the International Swingers and Chelsea.

Music career
Stevenson started his career with the London-based punk band Chelsea in 1977, while he was still at school studying for A Level exams. He toured with Gen X as its lead guitarist in 1980. After Gen X broke up in early 1981 he worked with Kim Wilde, contributing to her first album, Kim Wilde, and second album, Select, and performing in all of Wilde's early videos including "Kids in America". Stevenson then formed Hot Club with former Sex Pistols bassist Glen Matlock. They released two singles on RAK Records.

In 1983, he toured as a member of Fischer Z singer John Watts' band in support of Watts' album The Iceberg Model. In 1985, he was briefly in a band formed with Glen Matlock and Gary Holton called the Gang Show. Later that year, he was asked to join post-punk band Gene Loves Jezebel when their guitarist left suddenly at the beginning of their first U.S. tour. Stevenson performed on the band's albums Discover, House of Dolls, Kiss of Life, Heavenly Bodies, VII,  The Thornfield Sessions  and Dance Underwater (2017). He produced Gene Loves Jezebel singer Jay Aston's solo album Unpopular Songs, Beki Bondage's solo album Cold Turkey and Gene October's solo album Life and Struggle, among others.

During 1994 and 1995, he provided additional guitar playing for the Cult during their world tour. He also contributed guitar to the song "Brand New You're Retro" by Tricky from his Maxinquaye album. He has contributed as a session guitarist on numerous recordings including artists as diverse as Scott Walker (the Drift and Bish Bosch), Henry Badowski (who he was at Chiswick Community School with), Charlie Harper, Duncan "Kid" Reid, Jimmy Nail, Helen Terry, Annabel Lamb, Louise and the Hothouse Flowers among others, and has composed music for TV and film.

In 1998, seven years after Mike Peters left the Alarm, he called upon Stevenson to back his solo projects, and the latter has been a permanent fixture in Peters' subsequent musical incarnations, resulting in minor chart success, first under the guise of the Poppyfields with the top 30 hit "45 RPM" in February 2004, and as the Alarm MMVI with the No. 24 single "Superchannel" in February 2006 (from the album Under Attack). He has played on all Alarm albums recorded since 2000 including In the Poppyfields, Under Attack, Counter Attack, Direct Action, Guerilla Tactics, Blood Red, Viral Black,  Equals, Sigma and War.

Stevenson still plays with the Alarm and Gene Loves Jezebel (Jay Aston's version). He also rejoined Chelsea, performing on their Faster, Cheaper and Better Looking (2006),  Saturday Night Sunday Morning (2015) and Mission Impossible (2017) albums. He also plays in Matlock's band the Philistines, and has contributed to Matlock's Open Mind and Born Running albums. He sometimes turns up in New York singer/songwriter Willie Nile's band when they play in the UK.

In 2011, Stevenson and Matlock formed supergroup the International Swingers with vocalist Gary Twinn and drummer Clem Burke. Via PledgeMusic, the band raised the money to record their first full-length album, The International Swingers (mixed by Peter Walsh), which was released in 2015. 

In January 2013, Stevenson released a three-track CD, "The Shape of Things to Come", via his own website. An album, Everything's Getting Closer to Being Over, followed in March 2014. The album, produced by Peter Walsh, featured Matlock, Steve Norman, Barriemore Barlow, Geoff Dugmore and others.

Stevenson rejoined the Cult as second guitarist for their "Electric 13" world tour throughout North America, Europe and Australia in summer 2013 and continued to tour with them in 2014.

Since 2014, Stevenson has been playing in the band Holy Holy, performing the music of David Bowie, alongside Mick Woodmansey, Tony Visconti and Glenn Gregory, among others. A recording of their London gig in September 2014 was released by Maniac Squat Records in 2015 as a live album, The Man Who Sold the World Live in London.

In the spring of 2017, Gene Loves Jezebel (Jay Aston's version) released their first studio album in 14 years on Westworld Recordings, Dance Underwater. He also contributed to the 2018 Daphne Guinness album Daphne and the Golden Chord, and her 2020 album Revelations, both produced by Tony Visconti.

Recently he has adopted a multi-instrumentalist role in the Alarm playing guitar, bass guitar, bass pedals and a bass/six string double-neck guitar made for him by Gordon-Smith Guitars.

On 9 July 2021, Stevenson released his second solo album The Other Side of the World, dedicated to his younger brother David and his fight against the terminal illness Pick's disease. It was recorded remotely during lockdown and again produced by Peter Walsh. As well as all guitars and lead vocals, Stevenson played all bass guitars too. Guest musicians include Harriet Stubbs and Terry Edwards, among others.

Personal life
His father was the writer John Stevenson. James has been married twice. His second wife was Westworld singer Elizabeth Westwood. He has an adult son, Oscar, from his first wife.

Discography

Solo albums
 Everything's Getting Closer to Being Over (2014)
 The Other Side of the World (2021)

Gene Loves Jezebel
Discover (1986)
The House of Dolls (1987)
Kiss of Life (1990)
Heavenly Bodies (1993)	
Discover (1995)	
In the Afterglow"" (live) (1995)VII (1999)The Thornfield Sessions (2003)		Dance Underwater (2017)

Jay AstonUnpopular Songs'' (1998)

References

External links

The International Swingers' official website

Living people
1958 births
English punk rock guitarists
English session musicians
English new wave musicians
Generation X (band) members
The Alarm members
Gene Loves Jezebel members
The International Swingers members
Holy Holy (tribute band) members